TheCable is an independent online newspaper in Nigeria. It was launched on April 29, 2014 by Simon Kolawole, the former editor of the This Day newspaper. Its publisher Cable Newspaper Ltd was established on November 29, 2011.

Key staff 
Fisayo Soyombo, Pioneer Editor (April, 2014 to January, 2017)
Kolapo Olapoju, Editor
CEO: Simon Kolawole

References

2011 establishments in Nigeria
Companies established in 2011
Nigerian news websites